is a Japanese drama that was broadcast on NTV on August 29, 2009 and starred Ryo Nishikido in the title role. The special was based on a true story and the original novel of the same name by Kawakami Masumi.

Synopsis
Keisuke Kawai (Ryo Nishikido) is a young man who aspired to become a physicist since he was young. His hopeful parents send him to an expensive college prep school, but at the age of 15, during his third year of junior high, he is diagnosed with a brain tumor. Told that he only has one year to live, he falls into despair, giving up on treatment and even lashing out against his own mother.

Cast
Ryo Nishikido as Keisuke Kawai
Tanaka Rena as Shiori Amami
Ryosuke Yamada as Yuji Kawai
Yumi Shirakawa as Chiyo Kawai
Hitomi Kuroki as Kasumi Kawai
Takanori Jinnai as Yoichi Kawai
Makiya Yamaguchi as Hirofumi Doi
Yorie Yamashita as doctor
Yuta Kanai
 Yusuke Yamazaki
 Naoto Kinosaki
 Yuji Ishikawa

Notes
The drama was the Special for NTV's 24Hour Television event.

External links
Official website 

Japanese drama television series
Television shows written by Kazuhiko Yukawa